Peterview is a town located in the Exploits Valley area of central Newfoundland and Labrador, Canada, where Peters River empties into the Bay of Exploits, just south of Botwood, off Route 350.

Originally named Peters Arm, the community was incorporated as the Town of Peterview in 1962. The mayor is Jim Samson and the deputy mayor is Pleman Brown. According to the 2001 Statistics Canada census, Peterview has a population of 807 with 266 private dwellings.

Peterview has connections to Demasduwit (Mary March), a figure in Newfoundland history and one of the last Beothuk Indians, as John Peyton, one of her captors, built the first house in the area.

Demographics 

See also
 List of cities and towns in Newfoundland and Labrador

References

Populated coastal places in Canada
Towns in Newfoundland and Labrador
1962 establishments in Canada